Mangalpalle or Magalpally is a village in Ranga Reddy district in Telangana, India. It falls under Ibrahimpatnam mandal.

Mangalpally Logistic Park
The Mangalapally Logistic Park, an inter-city truck terminal, which is coming up on 22 acres near the Outer Ring Road, Hyderabad towards Nagarjunasagar road at a cost of Rs.20 crore.

References

Villages in Ranga Reddy district